The Wii U GamePad is the standard game controller for Nintendo's Wii U home video game console. Incorporating traits from tablet computers, the GamePad has traditional input methods (such as buttons, dual analog sticks, and a D-pad), touchscreen controls, and motion controls. The touchscreen can be used to supplement a game by providing alternate, second screen functionality or an asymmetric view of a scenario in a game. The screen can also be used to play a game strictly on the GamePad screen, without the use of a television display. Conversely, non-gaming functions can be assigned to it as well, such as using it as a television remote.

The Wii U GamePad can be used in conjunction with other controllers compatible with the console, such as the Wii Remote Plus, Nunchuk, Wii Balance Board, and the more conventional Wii U Pro Controller.

History

During development of the Wii console, video game designer Shigeru Miyamoto brought in mobile phones and controllers for automotive navigation systems for inspiration for the Wii Remote, eventually producing a prototype that resembled a cell phone. Another design featured both an analog stick and a touchscreen, but Nintendo rejected the idea of a touchscreen on the controller, "since the portable console and living-room console would have been exactly the same".

Nintendo's development team had determined that the Wii's notification light did not provide enough information to be useful beyond whether it had received content or not. With the complexity of modern televisions, Miyamoto believed that a monitor separate from the console would provide an easier way to check on the console's status without needing to use the television. Its operation as a supplemental display was also inspired by the common use of a similar display at karaoke establishments in Japan, which displays song information and also allows its users to select their next song.

Satoru Iwata explained that the controller's design is intended to allow players to "see games in a different way," a concept referred to as "asymmetric gaming" during Nintendo's E3 2012 press conference.  With the Wii U's Miiverse social networking functionality, Iwata also likened the controller's screen to a "social window", which can allow users to remain connected even if they are not playing. Gyroscopic capabilities were added by the team specifically to aid in aiming for first and third person shooter games.

The Nintendo EAD development team created two controller prototypes: a monitor with two Wii Remotes glued to the sides, and a display attached to a Wii Zapper. In a prototype shown at E3, the controller had featured circle pads similar to those of the Nintendo 3DS. On May 19, 2012, a photograph of a near-final version of the controller was leaked on Twitter by an employee of TT Games, revealing a wider build with ergonomic grips, a redesigned button layout, and analog sticks instead of circle pads. On June 3, 2012, Nintendo officially unveiled the final version of the controller, named "Wii U GamePad", in a video presentation preceding E3 2012. The presentation confirmed the leaked changes, and unveiled other features making use of the screen.

Features
The GamePad's primary feature is its , FWVGA (854x480), resistive touchscreen display, which can be controlled with either fingers or an included stylus. The screen can be used as a supplement to gameplay to provide additional functionality that can be controlled using the screen, or to stream gameplay from the console in lieu of a television display (Off-TV Play). The controller also features a front-facing camera (usable for video chat), dual analog sticks,  nine-axis motion detection via a three-axis accelerometer, three-axis gyroscope and a three-axis magnetometer, rumble support, and an infrared array that can emulate the Wii Sensor Bar. The GamePad also supports NFC, which allows developers to create figurines (such as Nintendo's Amiibo figures) or cards that can wirelessly interact with the controller, and allows Japanese users to pay for software on the Nintendo eShop using prepaid FeliCa-based transit cards such as Suica. In a special presentation preceding E3 2012, Nintendo unveiled more details about the GamePad; including its ability to be used as a remote control for a television with the Nintendo TVii app, and the ability to send handwritten messages and other content.

The GamePad communicates with a Wii U console over a modified Wi-Fi protocol designed for low-latency transmission, establishing its connection with the console by using a variant of the WPS process, with proprietary transfer protocol and software co-developed with Broadcom. The GamePad's display contents are streamed as video from the console using a custom protocol and the H.264 video codec, for which the GamePad contains a hardware decoder.

Nintendo's first presentation of the controller in 2011 led to confusion upon whether the Wii U would support the use of multiple GamePads. A Nintendo spokesperson stated that the GamePad would not be sold individually from a Wii U console, and Shigeru Miyamoto had not ruled out the possibility of using multiple GamePads with a single console—but also felt that it might be more convenient to use the Nintendo 3DS as a controller in this scenario as well—implying potential compatibility. During Nintendo's E3 2012 presentation, it was confirmed that Wii U games could theoretically support up to two GamePads simultaneously. However, this feature was ultimately never supported by any official software.

See also

 List of Nintendo controllers
 Off-TV Play
 Xbox SmartGlass
 Wii Remote

References

Nintendo controllers
Wii U

fi:Wii U#Wii U GamePad